Gloria Amparo Galeano Garcés (April 22, 1958 – March 23, 2016) was a Colombian botanist and agronomist specializing in the palm family. Galeano was a faculty member at the National University of Colombia, and was the director of the Institute of Natural Sciences from 2003 to 2006. She received her Ph.D. from the University of Aarhus, Denmark in 1997. 

Galeano authored taxonomic descriptions of 58 species, subspecies and varieties of plants, especially in the palm family. She published 17 books, 68 scientific papers, and 15 book chapters, mostly on palm and its taxonomy, systematics, ecology, uses, traditional knowledge, ecology, conservation and harvest impacts of Colombian plants and Neotropical palms. She also co-authored a field guide to the palms of the Americas.

In 1996 she won the science prize from Fundación Alejandro Angel Escobar for the Field guide to American palms (co-authored by Andrew Henderson & Rodrigo Bernal). 

The palm species Geonoma galeanoae is named after her.

New species of plants discovered

Arecaceae 
 Aiphanes acaulis  – Principes 29(1): 20. 1985
 Aiphanes graminifolia  – Caldasia 24(2): 277 (-280; fig. 1). 2002
 Astrocaryum triandrum  – Candollea 43(1): 279 (1988)
 Bactris rostrata  – Caldasia 24(2): 280 (-283; fig. 2). 2002
 Ceroxylon amazonicum  – Caldasia 17: 398 fig. 1995
 Ceroxylon echinulatum  – Caldasia 17: 399-402 fig. 1995
 Ceroxylon parvum  – Caldasia 17: 403 1995
 Ceroxylon peruvianum  – Revista Peru. Biol. 15(Supl. 1): 65 (-67; figs. 1-3). 2008
 Ceroxylon sasaimae  – Caldasia 17: 404-405 fig. 1995
 Chamaedorea murriensis  – Principes 31: 143 1987
 Chamaedorea ricardoi  – Palms 48(1): 27 (-29; fig. 1). 2004
 Geonoma chlamydostachys  – Principes 30: 71 1986
 Geonoma santanderensis  – Caldasia 24(2): 282 (-284; fig. 3). 2002
 Geonoma wilsonii  – Caldasia 24(2):284 (-290; figs. 4-5). 2002
 Oenocarpus makeru  – Brittonia 43(3): 158 (1991)
 Oenocarpus simplex  – Brittonia 43(3): 154 (1991)
 Sabinaria  – Phytotaxa 144: 28. 2013
 Sabinaria magnifica  – Phytotaxa 144: 34
 Wettinia oxycarpa  – Caldasia 13(65): 695 (1983)

Cyclanthaceae 
 Asplundia harlingiana  – Caldasia 14: 27 (-28). 1984
 Asplundia sanctae-ritae  – Caldasia 14: 28 (-29). 1984 
 Asplundia sarmentosa  – Caldasia 14: 29 (-30). 1984
 Dicranopygium fissile  – Caldasia 14: 31, figs. 1984
 Dicranopygium scoparum  – Caldasia 14: 32, figs. 1984

Notes

External links
 Faculty web page at the National University of Colombia.

1958 births
2016 deaths
20th-century Colombian botanists
Women botanists
20th-century Colombian women scientists
21st-century Colombian women scientists
Colombian women biologists
21st-century Colombian botanists